Duhamel Broadcasting Tower Angora is a tall guyed mast located at Angora, Nebraska.

The tower serves as the broadcasting platform for the Duhamel-owned TV stations KDUH-TV 4/DT 7 in Scottsbluff, Nebraska, which is 30 miles (50 kilometers) away.

The tower was built as a replacement for their 599-meter tower near Hemingford, Nebraska, which collapsed in 2002, killing two tower workers and injuring three.

See also
List of masts

External links
 

Towers completed in 2003
Radio masts and towers in the United States
Towers in Nebraska
Guyed masts
Buildings and structures in Morrill County, Nebraska
2003 establishments in Nebraska